James Moss (born 5 December 1945) is a New Zealand cricketer. He played in six first-class matches for Wellington from 1965 to 1970.

See also
 List of Wellington representative cricketers

References

External links
 

1945 births
Living people
New Zealand cricketers
Wellington cricketers
Cricketers from Invercargill